Claire Feuerstein (born 28 February 1986) is a former tennis player from France. 

She made her debut in professional competition in 2002, aged 16, at an ITF tournament in Les Contamines, France.

From 2002 to 2009, she played at many ITF tournaments, with three wins. Her first appearance in a WTA Tour event was at the 2009 Internationaux de Strasbourg, where she lost in the first round of the singles competition, but reached the final in doubles with partner Stéphanie Foretz.

She received a wildcard entry into the main draw of the 2009 French Open and lost to No. 7 seed, Svetlana Kuznetsova, in the first round.

WTA career finals

Doubles: 1 (runner-up)

ITF Circuit finals

Singles: 19 (11–8)

Doubles: 10 (2–8)

External links
 
 

French female tennis players
Sportspeople from Grenoble
1986 births
Living people
French people of German descent
21st-century French women